Labidostomma aethiopica is a species of mite belonging to the family Labidostommatidae. This three-eyed oval mite is fairly large for the family but is still less than 1 mm in length. The body is marked with a reticulated pattern, although this becomes faint towards the back. All the legs are shorter than the body. This species has been recorded from grass and soil in the vicinity of Bathurst, South Africa.

References
New species of mites of the families Tydeidae and Labidostommidae (Acarina: Prostigmata) collected from South African plants Magdelena K. P. Meyer & P. A. J. Ryke. Acarologia vol I

Trombidiformes
Animals described in 1959
Arachnids of Africa